{{DISPLAYTITLE:Ru360}}
Ru360 is an oxo-bridged dinuclear ruthenium ammine complex with an absorption spectrum maximum at 360 nm. It is an analog of ruthenium red, a well-known effective inhibitor of the mitochondrial calcium uniporter.

Ru360 was discovered after scientists found that commercial preparations of ruthenium red were often less than 20% pure, and that the crude mixture produced a stronger inhibition than the purified product. This component was later isolated and its structure determined, Ru360 has structural formula (μ-O)[(HCO2)(NH3)4Ru]2Cl3, that is, an oxygen-linked chain only two octahedral ruthenium–ammine units rather than the three of ruthenium red. One of the ruthenium atoms is in a +3 oxidation state, and the other in a +4  oxidation state. In addition to the four ammonia ligands, each ruthenium also has one formate group and there are a total of three chloride ions to balance the charge. In solution, chloride or hydroxide groups displace the formates.

Since Ru360 inhibits the flow of calcium into mitochondria, which can prevent the opening of the mitochondrial permeability transition pore, it has been investigated as a therapeutic treatment for stroke and heart attack.

References 

Ruthenium complexes
Ion channel blockers
Formates
Ammine complexes
Chloro complexes
Mixed valence compounds